Aubrey Smith may refer to:

 Aubrey Smith (Royal Navy officer) (1872–1957)
 Aubrey Smith (athlete) (born 1988), track and field athlete
 Aubrey Henry Smith (1814–1891), lawyer, U.S. district attorney and railroad executive
 C. Aubrey Smith (1863–1948), England cricketer and actor